Psalm 44 is the 44th psalm of the Book of Psalms, beginning in English in the King James Version: "We have heard with our ears, O God, our fathers have told us". In the slightly different numbering system used in the Greek Septuagint version of the bible, and generally in its Latin translations, this psalm is Psalm 43. In the Vulgate, it begins "Deus auribus nostris audivimus patres nostri adnuntiaverunt". The psalm was composed by the sons of Korah and is classified in the series of lamentations of the people. 

The psalm forms a regular part of Jewish, Catholic, Lutheran, Anglican and other Protestant liturgies and has often been set to music.

Text

Hebrew Bible version 
The following is the Hebrew text of Psalm 44:

King James Version 
 We have heard with our ears, O God, our fathers have told us, what work thou didst in their days, in the times of old.
 How thou didst drive out the heathen with thy hand, and plantedst them; how thou didst afflict the people, and cast them out.
 For they got not the land in possession by their own sword, neither did their own arm save them: but thy right hand, and thine arm, and the light of thy countenance, because thou hadst a favour unto them.
 Thou art my King, O God: command deliverances for Jacob.
 Through thee will we push down our enemies: through thy name will we tread them under that rise up against us.
 For I will not trust in my bow, neither shall my sword save me.
 But thou hast saved us from our enemies, and hast put them to shame that hated us.
 In God we boast all the day long, and praise thy name for ever. Selah.
 But thou hast cast off, and put us to shame; and goest not forth with our armies.
 Thou makest us to turn back from the enemy: and they which hate us spoil for themselves.
 Thou hast given us like sheep appointed for meat; and hast scattered us among the heathen.
 Thou sellest thy people for nought, and dost not increase thy wealth by their price.
 Thou makest us a reproach to our neighbours, a scorn and a derision to them that are round about us.
 Thou makest us a byword among the heathen, a shaking of the head among the people.
 My confusion is continually before me, and the shame of my face hath covered me,
 For the voice of him that reproacheth and blasphemeth; by reason of the enemy and avenger.
 All this is come upon us; yet have we not forgotten thee, neither have we dealt falsely in thy covenant.
 Our heart is not turned back, neither have our steps declined from thy way;
 Though thou hast sore broken us in the place of dragons, and covered us with the shadow of death.
 If we have forgotten the name of our God, or stretched out our hands to a strange god;
 Shall not God search this out? for he knoweth the secrets of the heart.
 Yea, for thy sake are we killed all the day long; we are counted as sheep for the slaughter.
 Awake, why sleepest thou, O Lord? arise, cast us not off for ever.
 Wherefore hidest thou thy face, and forgettest our affliction and our oppression?
 For our soul is bowed down to the dust: our belly cleaveth unto the earth.
 Arise for our help, and redeem us for thy mercies' sake.

Structure 
Usually, the Psalm is organized as follows:
Verses 2-9: Healing Historical Review.
Verses 10-23: describing the current disaster.
Verses 24-27: Final request for termination of the disaster through the intervention of God.
Another scheme put forward to reflect the flow of Psalm 44 is as follows (using English versification):
 Remembering that God performed mighty deeds in the past for his people (vv. 1–3)
 Desiring God to perform mighty deeds now (vv. 4–8)
 Lamenting God's "recent" chastening of his people (vv. 9–16)
 Appealing to God that his chastening is not a result of their sin (vv. 17–22)
 Calling on God to again engage in his mighty deeds on their behalf (vv. 23–26).

As a central message of the psalm Hermann Gunkel noted the contrast between past and present events.

In Jewish traditions, it is viewed as suffering in the face of the golden past, which all the more shows the plight of the current situation.

Structure and theme 
The psalm begins with a recounting of the days of old in verse 2, that God had driven out the nations and planted the Israelites, placing this well after the periods of conquest and the judges. The reference to scattering the Israelites among the nations in verse 11 could point to a date after either the Assyrian captivity in 722 B.C. or after the Babylonian captivity in 586 B.C. However, some have noted that the reference to God not going out with their armies in verse 9 would indicate that the Jewish nation still had standing armies at the time of the writing of this psalm, and thus the setting would be prior to Judah's exile to Babylon. In addition, the psalmist's insistence in verses 17 and 18 that their plight was not due to national sin is further confirmation that the psalmist is not referring to a time after the Babylonian exile, which the prophets made clear was, in fact, a result of idolatry and turning away from the Lord. By no means conclusive, a conflict is recorded in Isaiah 36, 2 Chronicles 32, and 2 Kings 18 matching the above suggested timeline for Psalm 44. The writer of the Explaining the Book commentary notes that neither Charles Spurgeon nor Matthew Henry felt that they could be clear about the setting for this psalm. The Jerusalem Bible suggests that verses 17-22 "may perhaps have been added later to adapt the psalm to the persecutions of the Maccabean period".

Uses

Judaism 
 Verse 9 is found in the repetition of the Amidah during Rosh Hashanah.
 Parts of verses 14 and 23 form a verse found in the long Tachanun recited on Mondays and Thursdays.
 Verse 27 is the sixth verse of Hoshia Et Amecha in Pesukei Dezimra.

New Testament 
Verse 22 is referenced by the Apostle Paul in the New Testament book "the Epistle to the Romans 8:36" in the context of realities that can make Christians think that they are separated from God's love.

Book of Common Prayer 
In the Church of England's Book of Common Prayer, this psalm is appointed to be read on the morning of the ninth day of the month.

Literary form 
Psalm 44 is a psalm of communal lament, indicating that the suffering, in this case from being defeated by enemies, is communal.

This Psalm reflects each of five key elements of a lament, or complaint, Psalm:

 Address: Verse 1
"We have heard with our ears, O God, our ancestors have told us, what deeds you performed in their days, in the days of old" (44:1)

In this case, the Psalmist is speaking directly to God. 
 Complaint: verses 9–16, 17-19

In these verses, the Psalmist laments that God has been slow to act and has a responsibility to save these people from their enemies.
 Statement of trust in the reliability of God as known by the Psalmist or community: verses 4-8

The Psalmist recites a history of God's saving acts, which includes reference to God commanding victories for Jacob.
Petition for God's active intervention: verses 23-26

These petitions can be quite specific. In verse 26, the Psalmist gives a direct command to God to "Rise up, come to our help."
Vow of Thanksgiving: verse 8

This particular Psalm includes a brief vow of thanksgiving in verse 8, when the Psalmist writes "In God we have boasted continually, and we will give thanks to your name forever" (44:8)

A note about superscripts 
The superscript of Psalm 44 reads "To the Leader. Of the Korahites. A Maskil". It is addressed to the leader of the Korahites, who were likely a group of people who played a role in the music or worship of the temple. The term "Maskil" means "artistic song" and its inclusion in the superscript of this Psalm indicates that it was originally written with artistic skill.

Musical settings 
Heinrich Schütz wrote a setting of a paraphrase of Psalm 44 in German, "Wir haben, Herr, mit Fleiß gehört", SWV 141, for the Becker Psalter, published first in 1628.

References

External links 

 
 
 Text of Psalm 44 according to the 1928 Psalter
  in Hebrew and English - Mechon-mamre
 Psalm 44 – Accounted as Sheep to the Slaughter text and detailed commentary, enduringword.com
 For the leader. A maskil of the Korahites. O God, we have heard with our own ears; our ancestors have told us text and footnotes, usccb.org United States Conference of Catholic Bishops
 Psalm 44:1 introduction and text, biblestudytools.com
 Psalm 44 / Refrain: Rise up, O Lord, to help us. Church of England
 Psalm 44 at biblegateway.com
 Hymns for Psalm 44 hymnary.org

044